Dagger Island is an island in Nueces County, Texas and part of Aransas Pass, Texas, but closer to central Ingleside, Texas. Corpus Christi Bay is located to the south. Redfish Cove is to the north.

References

Islands of Nueces County, Texas